World Collection is a series of Japanese releases for original Xbox games published by Microsoft, featuring select overseas (North American and European) titles, released at a reduced price compared to normal releases. Titles in this series retain their original overseas cover artwork with a "World Collection" border, and are left entirely in English, with a Japanese-language manual. The series was launched in October 2003, with regular releases every 2-3 months until August 2005.

References

Microsoft franchises

Video game franchises
Video game franchises introduced in 2003